Invoxia is a French consumer electronics company known for the design and development of innovative smart devices that use artificial intelligence, such as the first GPS tracker on the market to use LoRa technology (introduced in 2017), the first connected speaker outside the Amazon ecosystem to use the Alexa voice system and a line of GPS trackers for preventing bike theft and monitoring pet activity. For the B2B market, it provides fleet tracking and asset management services. It also provides industrial IoT services including hardware design and development and the training and integration of neural networks.

Invoxia was founded in 2010 by the French serial entrepreneur Éric Careel (also Withings, Sculpteo and Zoov) and Serge Renouard.

Invoxia is backed by Newfund since 2012. In 2013, Invoxia took control of the ancestral telephone manufacturer Swissvoice.

In October 2015, Amazon announces Invoxia as a recipient of the Alexa Fund to integrate Alexa voice services into Triby.

Products

 NVX 610: a smart desktop and conference IP phone
 NVX 620 a smart desktop and conference IP phone
 NVX 220 a smart desktop IP phone
 AudiOffice a smart desktop and conference dock
 VoiceBridge: a device to merge landline and mobile
 Triby
 Triby IO
 GPS Tracker  a multipurpose GPS tracking unit operating on SIGFOX and LoRaWAN networks
 Bike Tracker  a GPS tracking unit designed for locating bicycles
 LongFi GPS Tracker  that operates on the decentralized Helium Network
 Smart Dog Collar  a biometric monitoring collar for dogs, with heart and respiratory rate measurement capability

Awards
Invoxia was awarded the CES Best Innovation Award 2012 for its Smart Office Phone at the Consumer Electronic Show in Las Vegas.
Invoxia won the 2012 Red Dot Design Award for the NVX 610 VoIP Phone.
Invoxia was awarded two CES Innovation Awards in 2016 in the categories "Portable Media Players and Accessories" and "Wireless Handsets."
Invoxia was awarded the CES Innovation Award in 2019 in the "Wearable" category for its Pet Tracker.
Invoxia was awarded the CES 2020 Innovation Award for its Bike Tracker.
Invoxia was awarded two CES Innovation Awards in 2022 in the categories "Wearable Technologies" and "Health and Wellness" for its Smart Dog Collar.

Further reading
 Newfund.fr
 Usinenouvelle.com
 Lesechos.fr

References

Electronics companies established in 2010
Telecommunications companies of France
Electronics companies of France
Consumer electronics brands
Home automation companies
French companies established in 2010
French brands